Macalla arctata is a species of snout moth in the genus Macalla. It was described by Herbert Druce in 1902 and is known from Peru (including Chanchamayo, the type location).

References

Moths described in 1902
Epipaschiinae